The 44th Biathlon World Championships was held in Khanty-Mansiysk, Russia from March 3–13, 2011.

There was a total of 11 competitions: sprint, pursuit, individual, mass start, and relay races for men and women, and mixed relay. All the events during this championships also counted for the 2010–11 Biathlon World Cup season.

Championship highlights
The Championships kicked off with the Mixed relay event which is seeking to make its way onto the Olympic programme for the 2014 games in Sochi.  As the first event of the programme, it was finally given importance by the different teams, with all nations fielding their best teams, in difference to earlier world cup events.  The Norwegians won it, overtaking Germany on the last leg. The veteran Ole Einar Bjørndalen won his fifteenth world championship gold medal in the process and his first in the mixed relay, giving him a full set of gold medals in the six events that are currently contested.

Tarjei Bø, Martin Fourcade, Kaisa Mäkäräinen and Arnd Peiffer won their first champion titles in career. Martin Fourcade also won a full scope of medals, gold, silver and bronze at these championships.

The surprise medalists included Maxim Maximov of Russia, Tina Bachmann of Germany and Vita Semerenko of Ukraine.

Helena Ekholm literally swept the field in the individual with zero shooting and fast skiing, winning more than 2 minutes over the runner-up Bachmann and making one of the greatest 1–2 place margins in biathlon history.

Schedule of events

The provisional schedule of the event is below. All times in UTC+5.

Medal winners

Men

Women

Mixed

Medal table

Top nations

Top athletes
All athletes with two or more medals.

Participating countries
40 nations competed.

See also
2011 IPC Biathlon and Cross-Country Skiing World Championships

Notes

References

External links

Biathlon World Championships 2011 official site 

 
2011 in Russian sport
World Championships
2011
International sports competitions hosted by Russia
Sport in Khanty-Mansiysk
Biathlon competitions in Russia
March 2011 sports events in Russia